Steven Cheung may refer to:

 Steven Cheung (born 1982), American political advisor to President Donald J. Trump.

 Steven Cheung Chi-hang (born 1984), Hong Kong actor and member of the now disbanded boy band, Sun Boy'z
 Steven N. S. Cheung (born 1935), Hong Kong born economist, specializes in transaction costs and property rights
 Steven Dominique Cheung (born 1989), British Chinese Filipino, one of the youngest candidate in the European Election 2009